Anokharwal is a village in Shaheed Bhagat Singh Nagar district of Punjab State, India. The village is administrated by Sarpanch an elected representative of the village.

Demography 
As of 2011, Anokharwal has a total number of 112 houses and population of 524 of which 276 include are males while 248 are females according to the report published by Census India in 2011. The literacy rate of Anokharwal is 80.54%, higher than the state average of 75.84%. The population of children under the age of 6 years is 46 which is 8.78% of total population of Anokharwal, and child sex ratio is approximately 484 as compared to Punjab state average of 846.

Most of the people are from Schedule Caste which constitutes 48.47% of total population in Anokharwal. The town does not have any Schedule Tribe population so far.

As per the report published by Census India in 2011, 158 people were engaged in work activities out of the total population of Anokharwal which includes 149 males and 9 females. According to census survey report 2011, 99.37% workers describe their work as main work and 0.63% workers are involved in Marginal activity providing livelihood for less than 6 months.

Education 
The village has a Punjabi medium, co-ed primary school founded in 1953. The schools provide mid-day meal as per Indian Midday Meal Scheme. The school provide free education to children between the ages of 6 and 14 as per Right of Children to Free and Compulsory Education Act.

Amardeep Singh Shergill Memorial college Mukandpur and Sikh National College Banga are the nearest colleges.

Transport 

See also 
List of villages in India

References

External links 
 Tourism of Punjab
 Census of Punjab
 Locality Based PINCode

Villages in Shaheed Bhagat Singh Nagar district